Guo Gengmao (born December 1950) is a politician of the People's Republic of China. He served as Communist Party Secretary and Governor of Henan Province, as well as Governor of his native Hebei Province.

Biography
Guo Gengmao was born in Ji County, Hebei (now the county-level city of Jizhou), in December 1950. He joined the Communist Party of China (CPC) in March 1972. Guo graduated from the political science division of the International Politics faculty of Peking University. He also obtained a master's degree in Political Economics from the Central Party School.

Guo served in various positions in Hebei province for some 30 years. He began work in November 1975 as the deputy party secretary of a people's commune in Ji County. He was mayor of Xingtai from 1994 to 1997. Guo was then promoted to vice-governor of Hebei in 1998 and Executive Vice Governor of Hebei in 2000, as well as deputy secretary of the provincial government's leading party group. Guo then became the acting governor of Hebei and concurrently the deputy party secretary in October 2006, and was officially elected governor in January 2007.

In a reshuffling of provincial leadership in 2008, Guo was transferred to the neighboring Henan Province. He became the Deputy Communist Party Secretary of Henan in March 2008 in preparation for his governorship, and was appointed as the acting governor of Henan on April 7, 2008. On January 17, 2009, Guo was confirmed as governor of Henan.

In 2013, upon the departure of Lu Zhangong, Guo was promoted to party chief, having served for some seven years as governor of two provinces by this point. On 26 March 2016, Guo stepped down as Henan party chief after reaching the retirement age. He was succeeded by the governor Xie Fuzhan. After retiring from active politics, Guo sat on the National People's Congress Agriculture and Rural Affairs Committee as a vice chair.

Guo was an alternate member of the 16th Central Committee and is a full member of the 17th Central Committee and the 18th Central Committee of the CPC. He was a delegate to the 10th, 11th, and 12th National People Congresses.

References

External links
 Biography of Guo Gengmao , People's Daily.
 Biography of Guo Gengmao, Xinhua.

|-

|-

1950 births
Delegates to the 12th National People's Congress
Politicians from Hengshui
Living people
Chinese Communist Party politicians from Hebei
Mayors of places in China
People's Republic of China politicians from Hebei
Governors of Hebei
Governors of Henan
Peking University alumni
Members of the 18th Central Committee of the Chinese Communist Party
Members of the 17th Central Committee of the Chinese Communist Party
Alternate members of the 16th Central Committee of the Chinese Communist Party
Members of the 13th Chinese People's Political Consultative Conference
CCP committee secretaries of Henan